The 154th Infantry was an infantry regiment of the British Indian Army.  It was formed in Mesopotamia in May 1918, saw service in the First World War and the Third Anglo-Afghan War, and was disbanded in May 1921.

History

Background
Heavy losses suffered by the British Expeditionary Force on the Western Front following the German spring offensive in March 1918 resulted in a major reorganization of the Egyptian Expeditionary Force:
 two divisions52nd (Lowland) and 74th (Yeomanry) were transferred to France in April; they were replaced by the 3rd (Lahore) and 7th (Meerut) Divisions from Mesopotamia;
 nine yeomanry regiments were dismounted, converted to machine gunners and sent to France at the end of the same month; the 4th and 5th Cavalry Divisions were reformed with Indian cavalry regiments withdrawn from France and the 15th (Imperial Service) Cavalry Brigade already in Egypt;
 the 10th (Irish), 53rd (Welsh), 60th (2/2nd London), and 75th Divisions were reduced to a single British battalion per brigade.  They were reformed with nine Indian infantry battalions and an Indian pioneer battalion each.
In fact, the 75th Division already had four Indian battalions assigned, so of the 36 battalions needed to reform the divisions, 22 were improvised by taking whole companies from existing units already on active service in Mesopotamia and Palestine to form the 150th Infantry (3 battalions), 151st Sikh Infantry (3), 152nd Punjabis (3), 153rd Punjabis (3), 154th Infantry (3), 155th Pioneers (2), 156th Infantry (1) and the 11th Gurkha Rifles (4).  The donor units were then brought back up to strength by drafts.  In the event, just 13 of the battalions were assigned to the divisions and the remaining nine were transferred from Mesopotamia to India in June 1918.

Formation
The regiment was formed with three battalions in Mesopotamia in May 1918 by the transfer of complete companies posted from regiments serving in the 14th, 15th, 17th, and 18th Indian Divisions.  The 1st Battalion was transferred to India in June 1918 and later took part in the Third Anglo-Afghan War in 1919 as part of the Derajat Brigade.  The other two battalions were transferred to Egypt in July 1918, were assigned to British divisions and took part in the final Allied offensive of the Sinai and Palestine Campaign (the Battles of Megiddo).

Battalions

1st Battalion
The 1st Battalion was formed in Mesopotamia in May 1918 by the transfer of complete companies from:
94th Russell's Infantry
95th Russell's Infantry
96th Berar Infantry
97th Deccan Infantry

The battalion was transferred from Mesopotamia to India in June 1918 and joined the Derajat Brigade on the North-West Frontier where it remained in until the end of the First World War.  In May 1919, part of the battalion mobilized with the Derajat Brigade and took part in the Third Anglo-Afghan War.  The battalion was disbanded in 1919.

2nd Battalion
The 2nd Battalion was formed at Basra on 24 May 1918 by the transfer of complete companies from:
102nd King Edward's Own Grenadiers
108th Infantry
119th Infantry (The Mooltan Regiment)
122nd Rajputana Infantry

It embarked on 19 June for Egypt, arriving at Suez on 5 July and moved to Qantara.  On 16 July, it entrained and arrived at Lydda the next day.  The battalion joined the 233rd Brigade, 75th Division at Rantis on 25 July.  It remained with the division for the rest of the Sinai and Palestine Campaign, taking part in the Battle of Sharon (19 September 1918).  The division was then withdrawn into XXI Corps Reserve near et Tire where it was employed on salvage work and road making.  On 22 October it moved to Haifa where it was when the Armistice of Mudros came into effect and the war ended.

On 13 November, the 75th Division concentrated at Lydda and by 10 December had moved back to Qantara.  On 18 January 1919, instructions were received that the Indian battalions would be returned to India as transport became available.  The battalion was disbanded on 15 May 1921.

3rd Battalion
The 3rd Battalion was formed in Mesopotamia in May 1918 by the transfer of complete companies from:
112th Infantry
113th Infantry
114th Mahrattas
116th Mahrattas

The battalion disembarked at Suez on 5 July and reached Lydda on 17 July.  It joined the 158th Brigade, 53rd (Welsh) Division on 3 August near Jerusalem.  It remained with the division for the rest of the Sinai and Palestine Campaign, taking part in the Battle of Nablus (18–21 September 1918).  At the end of the battle, the division was employed on salvage work and working on the Nablus road.

On 27 October, the division started moving to Alexandria even before the Armistice of Mudros came into effect on 31 October, thereby ending the war against the Ottoman Empire.  It completed its concentration at Alexandria on 15 November.  The division received demobilization instructions on 20 December 1918.  The Indian infantry battalions returned to India as transports became available and the division was reduced to cadre by 7 June 1919.  The battalion was disbanded in 1919.

See also

 Indian Army during World War I

Notes

References

Bibliography

External links
 
 
 

British Indian Army infantry regiments
Military units and formations established in 1918
Military units and formations disestablished in 1921